The 1934 season was the Chicago Bears' 15th in the National Football League and 12th season under head coach  George Halas. The team was able to improve on their 10–2–1 record from 1933 and finished with an undefeated 13–0 record.

The season began with startling success, as the Bears reeled off nine straight wins in which they scored 20 or more points each game while allowing more than 7 points only twice. The last four wins were more difficult, including a tough win over the Giants in New York and back-to-back home-and-away close victories over the Detroit Lions in that franchise's first year in Detroit. The Bears outscored opponents 286–86, and became the first team to go unbeaten and untied in the NFL's regular season.

The Bears won the NFL Western Division title for the second straight year and met the NFL Eastern Division champion New York Giants once again in the NFL Championship game. The Bears were denied perfection as the Giants went on to win what would become known as the "Sneakers Game".

Season highlights
The 1934 Bears were without a doubt the best offensive team in NFL history to that point. They scored 37 touchdowns in 13 games, with 12 different players reaching the end zone during the year. Bronko Nagurski rushed for 586 yards on 123 carries and 8 touchdowns while blocking for a record-setting performance by rookie Beattie Feathers. Feathers, who played in only 11 games due to a shoulder injury, rushed for 1,004 yards and 8 touchdowns. He was not only the NFL's first official 1,000-yard rusher, but he performed this feat 12 years before it would be repeated (by Steve Van Buren in 1946) in an era when all players "went both ways" and many backs on a team shared rushing, receiving, and passing duties. The Bear offense was far more, however, than Nagurski and Feathers running the ball. Red Grange, Carl Brumbaugh, Bill Hewitt, and Gene Ronzani each caught at least 2 touchdown passes, four different players passed for 3 or more each, and "Automatic" Jack Manders led the league with 10 field goals. The club's line got even better than before with Walt Kiesling joining Lyman, Musso, and Kopcha on the best interior unit in football. The Bears breezed into the Polo Grounds in New York as heavy favorites to win their third straight NFL title.

Championship game

The Bears again met the NFL Eastern Division champion New York Giants in the NFL Championship game, this time in New York. The game was played at the Polo Grounds on a very slick, ice-covered field. The Bears were also without star halfback Feathers and All-Pro guard Kopcha. Both teams struggled with the field conditions but the Bears were able to post a 13–3 lead early in the third quarter. The Giants had famously changed their cleats to sneakers at halftime and this gave them an advantage in footing as well as a psychological advantage over the Bears. 27 unanswered New York points ensued, and the Giants won their second NFL title and first championship game, 30–13. Thus, the Bears were denied a perfect season.

Future Hall of Fame players
 Red Grange, back
 Bill Hewitt, end
 Walt Kiesling, guard (acquired from Cardinals)
 Link Lyman, tackle
 George Musso, tackle
 Bronko Nagurski, fullback

Other leading players
 Carl Brumbaugh, quarterback
 Beattie Feathers, back (rookie from University of Tennessee)
 Luke Johnsos, end
 Bill Karr, end
 Joe Kopcha, guard
 Jack Manders, back/kicker
 Keith Molesworth, back
 Gene Ronzani, back

Schedule

Standings

References

Chicago Bears
Chicago Bears seasons
Chicago Bears